Gnathophis grahami, or Graham's conger, is an eel in the family Congridae (conger/garden eels). It was described by Emma Stanislavovna Karmovskaya and John Richard Paxton in 2000. It is a subtropical, marine eel which is known from New South Wales, Australia, in the southwestern Pacific Ocean. It dwells at a depth range of 50–350 metres.

Etymology
The fish is named in honor of Kenneth Graham (b. 1947), with the New South Wales Fisheries, who provided the type specimen of this species and other east coast specimens to the Australian Museum.

References

grahami
Taxa named by Emma Stanislavovna Karmovskaya
Taxa named by John Richard Paxton
Fish described in 2000